Samuel Smith (November 11, 1765 – April 25, 1842) was an American politician, and a U.S. Representative from New Hampshire.

Early life
Born in Peterborough in the Province of New Hampshire, Smith attended Phillips Exeter Academy, Exeter, New Hampshire, and Phillips Academy, Andover, Massachusetts.

Career
Smith engaged in mercantile pursuits and served as moderator in town meetings, 1794-1811.

Elected as a Federalist to the Thirteenth Congress, Smith was United States Representative for the state of New Hampshire from March 4, 1813 – March 3, 1815.  He was not a candidate for renomination in 1814 and resumed his former business pursuits. In 1828, he engaged in the manufacture of paper and cotton goods.

Death
Smith died in Peterborough, Hillsborough County, New Hampshire, on April 25, 1842 (age 76 years, 165 days). He is interred at Village Cemetery, Peterborough, New Hampshire.

Family life
Smith was brother of Jeremiah Smith and uncle of Robert Smith. He married Sally Garfield on November 10, 1793 and they had twelve children: Jeremiah, Frederick A., Maria, Samuel Garfield, Albert, William Sidney, Alexander Hamilton, Elizabeth Morison, Sarah Jane, Maria, Mary Soley, and Ellen.

References

External links

 

1765 births
1842 deaths
Federalist Party members of the United States House of Representatives from New Hampshire
People from Peterborough, New Hampshire